This is a list of results for the electoral district of Belmont in Western Australian state elections. The district has had two incarnations, the first from 1962 to 1974, the second from 1989 to the present.

Members for Belmont

Election results

Elections in the 2020s

Elections in the 2010s

Elections in the 2000s

Elections in the 1990s

Elections in the 1980s

Elections in the 1970s

Elections in the 1960s 

 Preferences were not distributed.

References

Western Australian state electoral results by district